Fusheng is a town under the administration of Yuecheng District, Shaoxing, Zhejiang, China. , it administers Fusheng Residential Neighborhood and the following 14 villages:
Fusheng Village
Nijialou Village
Wushi Village
Shangwang Village
Wenshan Village
Xiafeng Village
Lushan Village
Yifeng Village
Qingma Village
Fengwang Village
Hongshan Village
Zhugeshan Village
Dongxi Village
Jinxi Village

References 

Towns of Zhejiang
Shaoxing